Music Industry Arts may refer to:

 Fanshawe College's Music Industry Arts program
 List of music industry degree programs